Elizabeth Dale Samet (born August 14, 1969) is an author of numerous books, essays, and reviews on United States military history.

Biography 
Samet has been a Professor of English at West Point since 1997, an experience that has significantly shaped her work. Samet earned her Ph.D. in English literature from Yale and her B.A. from Harvard University. She is the recipient of multiple awards and honors for her work.

Samet's autobiographical book Soldier's Heart describes her experience teaching literature at the United States Military Academy, or West Point, to soldiers preparing to fight a war. In an interview with Dallas News, Samet noted that her interest in Ulysses S. Grant was what originally piqued her interest in teaching at West Point, as the military commander and president was a West Point alumnus. Her work explores the soldier's experience and the heartbreaking difficulties of losing her former students to war. She also seeks to make a connection between the civilian experience and that of those in the military.

She frequently writes for The New Republic and Bloomberg's publications.

Works

Books

Other works

Awards 
 2012 Hiett Prize in the Humanities
 2012 Guggenheim Memorial Foundation Fellow

References

External links
Samet on Soldiers Heart: Reading Literature Through Peace and War at West Point at the Pritzker Military Museum & Library

Living people
American military writers
Harvard University alumni
Yale University alumni
American women non-fiction writers
21st-century American women
1969 births